Ryūji (also spelled Ryuji or Ryuuji) is a common masculine Japanese given name.

Possible writings
Ryūji can be written using different kanji characters and can mean:
竜二, "dragon, 2"
竜次, "dragon, next"
竜司, "dragon, rule"
竜児, "dragon, child"
竜治, "dragon, govern"
龍二, "dragon, 2"
龍次, "dragon, next"
龍司, "dragon, rule"
龍治, "dragon, govern"
龍児, "dragon, child"
隆二, "elevate, 2"
隆次, "elevate, next"
隆司, "elevate, rule"
隆児, "elevate, child"

The name can also be written in hiragana りゅうじ or katakana リュウジ.

Notable people with the name
Ryuji Aigase (相ヶ瀬 龍史, born 1987), Japanese actor
Ryuji Aminishiki (安美錦 竜児, born 1978), Japanese sumo wrestler
Ryuji Bando (播戸 竜二, born 1979), Japanese footballer
Ryuji Chiyotaikai (千代大海 龍二, born 1976), Japanese sumo wrestler
, Japanese baseball player
Ryuji Hara (原 隆二, born 1990), Japanese boxer
Ryuji Hijikata (土方 隆司, born 1978), Japanese professional wrestler
Ryuji Imada (今田 竜二, born 1976), U.S.-based Japanese professional golfer
Ryuji Imaichi (今市 隆二, 1986), Japanese singer
Ryuji Ishino (石野 竜二, born 1978), Japanese footballer
Ryuji Ito (伊東 竜二, born 1976), Japanese professional wrestler
Ryuji Kajiwara (梶原 龍児, born 1976), Japanese kickboxer
Ryuji Kamiyama (上山 竜治, born 1986), Japanese vocalist and actor
, Japanese footballer
Ryuji Kashiwabara (柏原 竜二, born 1989), Japanese long-distance runner
Ryuji Kawai (河合 竜二, born 1978), Japanese football player
, Japanese baseball player
Ryuji Koga (古賀 龍二, born 1977), Japanese rugby player
Ryuji Masuda (増田 龍治, born 1968), Japanese CGI animation director
Ryuji Matsumura (松村 龍二, born 1938), Japanese politician
Ryuji Michiki (路木 龍次, born 1973), Japanese football player
Ryuji Miki (三木 竜二, born 1975), Japanese racing and drifting driver
Ryuji Miyamoto (宮本 隆司, born 1947), Japanese photographer
Ryuji Mochizuki (望月 竜次, 1988), Japanese footballer
, Japanese rugby union player
, Japanese long-distance runner
Ryuji Ōtani (大谷 龍次, born 1988), Japanese baseball player
Ryūji Saikachi (槐 柳二, born 1928), Japanese voice actor
Ryuji Sainei (載寧 龍二, born 1981), Japanese actor
, Japanese footballer
Ryuji Sasai (笹井 隆司, born 1961), video game composer
Ryuji Sonoda (園田 隆二, born 1973), Japanese judoka
Ryuji Sueoka (末岡 龍二, born 1979), Japanese footballer
Ryuji Takai (高井 隆司, born 1986), Japanese snowboarder
Ryuji Yamaguchi (山口 竜志, born 1985), Japanese professional wrestler
Ryuji Yamane (山根 隆治, born 1948), Japanese politician
Ryuji Yokoyama (横山 竜士, born 1976), Japanese baseball player
Ryuji Yonemura (米村 龍二, born 1995), Japanese rugby player

Fictional characters
Ryuji Danma (弾間 龍二), a character in the manga series Shonan Junai Gumi and its sequel Great Teacher Onizuka
Ryuji Goda (郷田 龍司), a side character in Yakuza 0 and the main antagonist in Yakuza 2 and Yakuza Kiwami 2
Ryuji "The Blade" Hanada (花田 竜二), a character in the manga series Crying Freeman
Ryuji Hattori (服部 竜二), a character from the Kunio-Kun video game series
Ryuji Ikeda (池田 竜次), a character in the manga series Initial D
Ryuji Iwasaki (岩崎 リュウジ), a character from Tokumei Sentai Go-Busters
Ryuji Kisaragi (如月 竜司), the main character of the light novel and anime series Dragon Crisis!
Ryuji Kusaka (九坂 隆二), a character from Inazuma Eleven GO Galaxy
Ryuji Midorikawa (綠川 龍二), a character from Inazuma Eleven
Ryuji Nagumo (七雲 竜次), a character from Hajime no Ippo
Ryuuji Otogi (御伽 龍児), a character in the anime and manga series Yu-Gi-Oh!
Ryuji Sakamoto (坂本 竜司), a major character in the video game Persona 5
Ryuji Sugashita (菅下 竜二), a character in the manga series DNA²
Ryuji Suguro (勝呂 竜士), a major character in Blue Exorcist
Ryuji Takane (高嶺 竜児), the main character of the manga and anime series Ring ni Kakero
Ryuji Takasu (高須 竜児), one of the main characters in the anime and light novel series Toradora!
Ryuji Takayama (高山 竜司), a central character in the Ringu Trilogy
Ryuji Toramaru (虎丸 龍次), a character in the manga series Sakigake!! Otokojuku 
Ryuji Yamazaki (山崎 竜二), a video game character in Fatal Fury and King of Fighters series

Japanese masculine given names